The theory of synoptical astrology was created by László Wladimir Orosz, Hungarian philosopher and astrologer.

This synopsis  considers the tropical and the sidereal zodiacs simultaneously with the constellational zodiac or the real zodiacal constellations.

By this approach, the tropical frame represents the destined ’earthly’ road, the personal life path and emphasizes mostly the psychic, somatic and psychosomatic elements of the nativities - in analogy with the gross body and the waking state, the sidereal and the real constellational ones give information on the spiritual (pneumatic) relations and reveals the After Death (post mortem) Conditions - in analogy with the subtle body and the dream state. In the sidereal frame, this school prefers the Fagan-Bradley ayanāṃśa .

The synoptical horoscope has its own unique way of drawing: we can view the tropical signs inside of the chartwheel, the sidereal zodiac is in the middle and the real constellations can be found in the outermost zone.

Since the real constellations are unequal, synoptical astrology divides the sectors uniquely. To measure these unequal sectors ’dynamic degrees’ are introduced.

A constellational sector is opened by the first 'fixed' star (in the direction of the planets' common moving) that is clearly belonging to the given constellation and traditionally considered so. The sector is bordered by the first 'marker' star of the next constellation. The ecliptic plane divides the sectors into northern and southern regions in some cases e. g. Aries - Taurus or Aquarius - Pisces, so, for example, a planet with northern ecliptic latitude enters the constellation of Pisces much sooner than one with southern latitude - in this system. Concerning the astrological aspects, Synoptical Astrology focuses also on the arithmological characteristics of the natural number (positive integer) which divide the circle of 360 degrees.

The unequal constellational sectors in the Synoptical Astrology are below.

Moreover, this synoptical approach includes the display of several lunar mansion systems (Indian, Chinese, Arabic, Scythian and others) based on either tropical or sidereal/constellational frame (view examples).

References

Sources
 
 
 

Astrology by type
Horoscopic astrology
History of astrology